Vitoševac is a village in the municipality of Ražanj, Serbia. According to the 2002 census, the village had a population of 1277 people.

References 

Populated places in Nišava District